The fourth and final season of Wilfred, premiered on FXX on June 25, 2014. The fourth season consisted of 10 episodes. The series is based on the original Australian series, Wilfred, and stars Elijah Wood, Jason Gann, Fiona Gubelmann and Dorian Brown.

Synopsis
In the fourth and final season of Wilfred, Ryan tries to figure out the truth behind "The Flock of the Grey Shepard".

Cast

Main cast
 Elijah Wood as Ryan Newman
 Jason Gann as Wilfred
 Fiona Gubelmann as Jenna Mueller
 Dorian Brown as Kristen Newman

Special guest cast
 James Remar as Henry
 Tobin Bell as Charles
 Mimi Rogers as Catherine
 Rutger Hauer as Dr. Grummons
 Allison Mack as Amanda
 William Baldwin as Bruce
 John Michael Higgins as Dr. Cahill

Recurring cast
 Chris Klein as Drew
 Rodney To as Dr. Bangachon
 Harriet Sansom Harris as Lonnie Goldsmith

Guest stars
 Julie Hagerty as Genevieve
 Nestor Carbonell as Arturo Ramos
 Randee Heller as Margot

Episodes

A * indicates that the individual episode ratings were unavailable, so the FXX primetime average is listed instead.

Production
On October 2, 2013, Wilfred was renewed for a ten-episode fourth and final season. The series moved to FX's sister network FXX with first two episodes back-to-back on June 25, 2014 and the final two episodes aired on August 13. David Zuckerman, who served as showrunner for the first two seasons, returned as co-showrunner after stepping down in season 3. The roles of Catherine and Bruce had to be recast after Mary Steenburgen and Dwight Yoakam were unable to reprise their respective roles due to scheduling conflict, and they were replaced by Mimi Rodgers and William Balwin.

The crew was given warning well ahead of time so the show's creators could tie up loose ends with the final season. The decision to end the series was ultimately made by FX. Jason Gann was intent on continuing the series stating, "We would have kept going. I think you would have to be crazy to quit a job like this." The return of show runner David Zuckerman, coupled with the focus on answering some of the show's deeper mythological questions, prevented Gann from writing any episodes in the final season.

Elijah Wood has stated that "Answers" is one of his favorite episodes of the series saying "I read the season kind of in order and I read like one through three and then I read four and it just totally blew my mind." His friend has taken the basement set and recreated it at his house. Wood himself has possession of a stuffed bear and a bong made from a Gatorade bottle, both featured prominently throughout the series.

Notes

References

External links 

Season 4
2014 American television seasons